Khobz tounes, also called khobz el bey, is an Algerian cake made from almond meal and breadcrumbs, soaked in a syrup flavored with orange flower water.  The cake dates from the Algeria's Ottoman period. It is commonly consumed during Ramadan.

See also
 List of cakes

References

External links
Video recipe with English subtitles

Algerian desserts
Iftar foods
Cakes
Ottoman cuisine
Almond desserts